This is a list of Turkish football transfers in the summer transfer window 2010 by club. Only transfers of the Süper Lig and 1st League are included.

Süper Lig

Ankaragücü

In:

Out:

Antalyaspor

In:

 

 

Out:

Beşiktaş

In:

 
 

Out:

Bucaspor

In:

Out:

Bursaspor

In:

Out:

Eskişehirspor

In:

Out:

Fenerbahçe

In:

Out:

Galatasaray

In:

Out:

Gaziantepspor

In:
 

 
Out:

Gençlerbirliği

In:
 

Out:

İstanbul Belediyespor

In:
 

Out:

Kardemir Karabükspor

In:
 

Out:

Kasımpaşa

In:

Out:

Kayserispor

In:

Out:

Konyaspor

In:
 

Out:

Manisaspor

In:

Out:

Sivasspor

In:
 

Out:

Trabzonspor

In:

Out:

First League

Akhisar Belediyespor

In:

Out:

Ankaraspor

In:

Out:

Boluspor

In:
 

Out:

Çaykur Rizespor

In:

Out:

Denizlispor

In:
 

Out:

Diyarbakırspor

In:
 

Out:

Gaziantep Belediyespor

In:
 

Out:

Giresunspor

In:

Out:

Güngören Belediyespor

In:

Out:

Kartalspor

In:

Out:

Kayseri Erciyesspor

In:

Out:

Mersin İdmanyurdu
See: 2010–11 Mersin İdmanyurdu summer transfers

Orduspor

In:
 

Out:

Samsunspor

In:
 

Out:

See also
2010–11 Süper Lig
2010–11 TFF First League

Transfers
Turkish
2010